Not Quite C (NQC) is a programming language, application programming interface (API), and native bytecode compiler toolkit for the Lego Mindstorms, Cybermaster and LEGO Spybotics systems. It is based primarily on the C language but has specific limitations, such as the maximum number of subroutines and variables allowed, which differ depending on the version of firmware the RCX has. The language was invented by David Baum. He has released two books on the subject.

Simple program example
A simple test program written in NQC for an RCX with a motor connected to output port A could look like this:
 task main    // Main program
 {
     SetPower(OUT_A, OUT_FULL);    // Turn on motor A at 100% power.
     OnFor(OUT_A, 200);            // Let the motor run for two seconds, and then turn it off.
 }
Thus, motor A will go at full speed for two seconds before being turned off.

Compilers and integrated development environments 
NQC compilers and integrated development environments (IDEs) are available for many platforms including Microsoft Windows, Mac OS X, Linux, BeOS and DOS. One is the Bricx Command Center.

References

Sources
Compiler sources:
 for Ubuntu

IDE sources:
 for DOS 
 for BeOS
 for OS X (Snow Leopard or Earlier)
 for Windows
 for Linux

External links 
 NQC Homepage
 NQC tutorial by Mark Overmars
 NQC tutorial by Matt Miller

Lego Mindstorms
C programming language family
Robot programming languages